Zombie Fluxx is a 2007 card game published by Looney Labs.

Gameplay
Zombie Fluxx is a version of Fluxx where the player has weapons and can kill things.

Reception
The game was reviewed in the online second volume of Pyramid.

Zombie Fluxx won the 2007 Origins Award for Traditional Card Game of the Year.

References

Card games introduced in 2007
Origins Award winners